The Courland Governorate, also known as the Province of Courland, Governorate of Kurland and known from 1795 to 1796 as the Viceroyalty of Courland was one of the Baltic governorates of the Russian Empire, that is now part of the Republic of Latvia.

The governorate was created in 1795 out of the territory of the Duchy of Courland and Semigallia that was incorporated into the Russian Empire as the province of Courland with its capital at Mitau (now Jelgava), following the third partition of the Polish–Lithuanian Commonwealth.

Courland and Livonia were united to form new state Republic of Latvia on 18 November 1918.

Geography
The governorate was bounded in the north by the Baltic Sea, the Gulf of Riga and the Governorate of Livonia; west by the Baltic Sea; south by the Vilna Governorate and Prussia and east by the Vitebsk Governorate and Minsk Governorate. The population in 1846 was estimated at 553,300.

It was situated between 55°41' and 57°45' N. Of its total border of 1,260 versts (1,344 km), the sea border is 320 versts (341 km). The border with Prussia is only 6 versts (6.4 km) long and lacks natural boundaries.

The surface area of the province is 23,977 square versts (27,290 km2).

Subdivisions
After the annexation to the Russian Empire, the Kurzeme Governorate united the lands of the Duchy of Courland and Semigallia and the Piltene district, both of which retained their previous administrative divisions.

After the administrative reform of 1819, the area of Pilten was incorporated into the territory of the province as the district of Windau (Hauptmannschaft Windau) and the district of Hasenpoth (Hauptmannschaft Hasenpoth). After the reform of 1819, the castle lord of Kandava moved to Talsi. The area of Palanga up to the Prussian border was also added to the Kurzeme province from the Vilna governorate. The province was divided into ten districts, or Hauptmannschaft, whose administrative authorities were located in the towns of the same name, with the exception of Talsi and Ilūkste, which had only the rights of towns. Each district had its own court with a local police force. Until 1864, every two districts were merged into Oberhauptmannschaft, which contained the Oberhauptmann and the Evangelical Lutheran Church dean's districts under the authority of the Oberhofgericht (Court of the Governor's Court).

The counties of the governorate were:

Law

The highest court is the Courts of Kurland (Kurländisches Oberhofgericht), the courts of appeal are the Higher Hauptmanns Courts (Oberhauptmannsgericht), The courts of first instance are the Hauptmannsgericht, the county courts (kreisgericht) for the peasantry, and the lowest level of the court system for the peasantry are the parish courts (Gemeindegericht).

Administration 
The province of Courland was governed by a governor appointed by the emperor. The representative body of local government was the Landtag (Kurländischer Landtag), which consisted of parish commissioners (Kirchspielsbevollmächtigter, Konvokant) elected by the parishes (Landtagskirchspiel, Parochie) by parish assemblies (Kirchspielsversammlung), In the parish meetings (Kirchspielsversammlung) all large landowners of the parish could participate, the executive body - a noble committee headed by a land commissioner (Landesbevollmächtige) was elected to conduct its sessions.

The residence of the governors was in Jelgava Castle, where the governorate's administrative offices were also located. During the existence of the Baltic Governorate (1801-1876, 1906–1909), the governors of Kurzeme were subordinate to the governor-general of the Baltic Provinces (German: Generalgouverneur der Ostseeprovinzen)., who resided in the Riga Castle.

Until Russification, almost all governors of Courland were German-Baltic noblemen. Until then, the language of administration in the highest authorities and courts of the province was German, but in the parish courts, according to the Courland peasant laws, the records were also kept in Latvian.
1795 – 1796 Baron Peter Ludwig von der Pahlen (temporary governor-general of Courland and Pilten)
1796 – 1798 Count Gustav Matthias Jakob von der Wenge genannt Lambsdorff
1798 – 1800 Baron Wilhelm Carl Heinrich von der Oest genannt Driesen
1800 – 1808 Nikolay Ivanovich Arsenyev
1808 Jakob Maximilian von Brieskorn (acting governor on 18–21 May 1812)
1808 – 1811 Baron Jan Willem Hogguer
1811 Jakob Maximilian von Brieskorn (acting governor in August–September 1812)
1811 – 1816 Count Friedrich Wilhelm von Sivers (1748–1823) (in exile in Riga during Napoleonic invasion of Courland in July–December 1812)
1812 Jules de Chambaudoin and Charles de Montigny (French intendants of Courland, Semigallia and Pilten on 1 August-8 October 1812)
1812 Jacques David Martin (French governor-general of Courland on 8 October-20 December 1812)
1816 – 1824 Emannuel von Stanecke
1824 – 1827 Paul Theodor von Hahn (1793–1862)
1827 – 1853 Christoph Engelbrecht von Brevern
1853 Aleksandr Petrovich Beklemishev (acting governor on 10 May–14 June 1853)
1853 – 1858 Pyotr Aleksandrovich Valuyev
1858  (acting governor on 10–21 May 1858)
1858 – 1868 Johann von Brevern
1868 – 1885 Paul Frommhold Ignatius von Lilienfeld-Toal
1885 Aleksandr Alekseyevich Manyos
1885 – 1888 Konstantin Ivanovich Pashchenko
1888 – 1891 Dmitry Sergeyevich Sipyagin
1891 – 1905 Dmitry Dmitriyevich Sverbeyev
1905 – 1906 Woldemar Alexander Valerian von Boeckmann
1906 – 1910 Leonid Mikhailovich Knyazev
1910 Nikolay Dmitriyevich Kropotkin
1910 – 1915 
1915–1917 Tatishchev, Pyotr Vasilyevich Gendrikov, Strakhov (in exile in Tartu after the German invasion of Courland in July 1915).

Economy

In the 19th century the province was predominantly agrarian. In 1817, serfdom was abolished in the province and peasants were granted personal freedom, but all land remained the property of landlords. In 1863 the peasants received the right to buy land as personal property, and a class of land owning peasants began to form. The land owning peasants, along with the German landlords, were the main suppliers of commercial agricultural products. The main crops grown in the province were rye, wheat, barley, peas, oats, and potatoes. Horticulture and gardening are well developed.

Industry of the province is mostly manufacturing. In 1912 there were about 200 factories and plants (mills, vodka mills, sawmills, tanneries, brick mills, flax-spinning factories, etc.) and about 500 cottage industries.

Railway construction was developing on the territory of the province. The Riga - Mitava railroad was built in 1867 and in 1871-76 a section of the Libava - Romena railroad. All in all the length of the railway lines in the province was over 560 versts.

Education in the province was better than the Russian average. In the 1910s there were 8 secondary schools (over 3 thousand students), 13 special secondary schools (over 460 students), 790 lower secondary schools (36.9 thousand students) in the province. In the province in 1913 there were 33 hospitals with 1,300 beds.

Language
By the Imperial census of 1897. In bold are languages spoken by more people than the state language.

See also
Reval Governorate
Riga Governorate
Saint Petersburg Governorate
Courland

References and notes

 
Governorates of the Russian Empire
Courland